The Judgment of Death Act 1823 (c.48; repealed) was an Act of the Parliament of the United Kingdom (although it did not apply to Scotland). Passed at a time when there were over 200 offences in English law which carried a mandatory sentence of death, it gave judges the discretion to pass a lesser sentence for the first time. It did not apply to treason or murder. The Act required judges to enter a sentence of death on the court record, but then allowed them to commute the sentence to imprisonment.

The Act was repealed in England and Wales by the Courts Act 1971, in the Republic of Ireland by the Statute Law Revision Act 1983 and repealed in 1980 in Northern Ireland. Since piracy with violence was still a capital crime, this had the (presumably unintended) effect of making the death penalty for that offence mandatory again, until the death penalty was totally abolished in 1998.

See also
Capital punishment in the United Kingdom

References

Further reading
The text of the act.

1823 in British law
United Kingdom Acts of Parliament 1823
English criminal law
Repealed United Kingdom Acts of Parliament
Anti–death penalty laws
Capital punishment in the United Kingdom